Roland J. Diggs was a Liberian Lutheran bishop. He was elected as Vice President in August 1990 to the interim administration of Amos Sawyer. He stepped down to concentrate on religious issues and was succeeded in April 1991 by Peter Naigow.

References 

Americo-Liberian people
Year of birth missing (living people)
Vice presidents of Liberia
Liberian Lutheran clergy
Lutheran bishops in Africa
Liberian bishops